Eschweiler is a municipality in the district of Aachen in North Rhine-Westphalia in Germany on the river Inde, near the German-Belgian-Dutch border, and about  east of Aachen and  west of Cologne.

History

 Celts (first ore mining) and Romans (roads and villae rusticae).
 828 First mentioned by Einhard, the biographer of Charlemagne.
 1394 Coal mining first mentioned.
 For some centuries part of the Duchy of Jülich.
 1678 Completely destroyed except one house and the valuable leather Pietà.
 1794 To France.
 1800 French municipal rights and capital of the Canton of Eschweiler in the French Département de la Roer.
 1816 To Prussia. The French Cantons of Burtscheid and Eschweiler are put together to form the Prussian Kreis Aachen.
 1838 Foundation of the first joint stock company in the then Kingdom of Prussia: Eschweiler Bergwerksverein (i.e. Eschweiler Coal Mining Company) EBV.
 1858 Prussian municipal rights. Its quarters Hehlrath, Kinzweiler and St. Jöris are released in order to form the new municipality of Kinzweiler.
 1932 Hastenrath and Nothberg become a part of Eschweiler.
 1944 Heavily destroyed in World War II, the last coal mine was flooded during the war and never been re-opened.
 Part of the federal land of North Rhine-Westphalia.
 1960s Complete modernization of Eschweiler's downtown and regulation of the Inde in order to prevent the regular inundations.
 1972 Reorganization of administration in North Rhine-Westphalia: Eschweiler increases overnight from some 38,000 inhabitants to about 55,000 by receiving the villages Dürwiß, Laurenzberg, Lohn and Weisweiler. Kinzweiler, after 114 years, comes back.
 1970s Eschweiler loses seven quarters because of the brown-coal opencast mining: Erberich, Hausen, Langendorf, Laurenzberg, Lohn, Lürken and Pützlohn.

Main sights
Eschweiler main sights include:
Artificial lake Blausteinsee ("Blue Stone Lake")
the Old Townhall (which is now the restaurant and conference wing of a hotel)
two pilgrim churches
main parish church of St. Peter und Paul with the Leather Pietà from 1360
the chapel
dwelling house of the former Cistercians nunnery of St. Jöris, skull relic in St. Jöris' church, baroque altar in Hehlrath's church
Old Mill of Gressenich.

Also present is a series of castle and manors:
Castle of Eschweiler (only three towers from the 13th century are left)
Castle of Kambach (beautiful water castle besides the golf course)
Castle of Kinzweiler
Castle of Nothberg
Castle of Palant
Castle of Röthgen
Castle of Weisweiler (only the towers and the outer walls are left)
Manor of Broich
Manor of Drimborn
Manor of Nothberg

Culture 
Eschweiler has three municipal halls (Dürwiß, Kinzweiler and Weisweiler), a cinema, a municipal art collection and the so-called Culture Centre Talbahnhof for cabaret and music events. Every summer the Eschweiler Music Festival EMF takes place. People go to the numerous pubs around the Market Place and in the old-town alley Schnellengasse as well as to the large-scale discothèque Klejbor's.

Carnival 
Eschweiler is a center of Rhineland carnival. It has more than 20 active carnival clubs, and every Monday before Lent it has the third of Germany's longest carnival processions.

Culinary specialities 

 Sauerbraten
 Potato fritters (Reibekuchen) with black bread, apple syrup, sugar beet syrup or stewed apples
 Blood sausage (Blutwurst) crude or fried
 Hemmel on Äed (i.e. Heaven and Earth) mashed potatoes with stewed apples and fried blood pudding or fried panhas
 Rice pies, apricot pies, pear pies ("Schwatze Flaam") - 20 cm in diameter; the pear pies, also called black pies, are traditionally served at funerals
 Horse and horse by-products

Medical care 
Eschweiler is home to the St. Antonius Hospital with 443 beds and 13 departments. Every year, there are some 15,000 in-patients and 25,000 out-patients. The Euregio Breast Centre is part of the hospital.

Sports 
Soccer, ice hockey, golf, open-air swimming pool, indoor swimming pool, horse sports, handball.

Industry 
Chemicals and goods are the main products, while it also has a lignite-powered power plant rated at 2.8 GW.

Science 
The lignite (brown coal) deposits in the region are former Miocene swamp forest dominated by Castanopsis, a type of chinkapin. Such plants do not occur naturally in Europe. A type of fossil wood has been described from logs found in Eschweiler mines. It was named Castanoxylon eschweilerense in reference to the town; the name would translate as "Eschweiler chinkapin wood", as it probably belonged to Castanopsis but perhaps to some other genus of chinkapin.

Transport 
Eschweiler has six railway stations: Eschweiler Hauptbahnhof (central station), Eschweiler-Aue (from 2009), Eschweiler-West, Eschweiler-Talbahnhof, Eschweiler-Nothberg, Eschweiler-Weisweiler and Nothberg (till 2009). Eschweiler-St. Jöris is planned.

Eschweiler has two bus terminals and bus lines in every quarter and in its whole vicinity. Autobahn exits on the A 4 include Eschweiler-West, Eschweiler-Ost and Weisweiler. The city can be reached also by three exits on the A 44: Aldenhoven, Alsdorf and Broichweiden.

Notable people

 Anna Sorokin (born 1991), fraudster 
 József Ács (born 1948), composer, conductor, director of the Franz Liszt Society of Eschweiler
 Theo Altmeyer (1931–2007), tenor
 Heinrich Boere (1921–2013), German-Dutch war criminal
 Götz Briefs (1889–1974), national economist and social philosopher
 Willibert Kauhsen (born 1939), racing driver
 Johannes Bündgens (born 1956), auxiliary bishop of Aachen
 Markus Daun (born 1980), soccer player
 Gerhard Fieseler
 Andreas Gielchen (born 1964), soccer player
 Susanne Kasperczyk (born 1985), soccer player
 Claus Killing-Günkel (born 1963), esperantologist
 Sascha Klein (born 1985), water jumper
 Kevin Kratz (born 1987), footballer
 Wilhelm Lexis (1837–1914), economist, national economist and statistician
 Franz Reuleaux (1829–1905), mechanical engineer
 Michaela Schaffrath (born 1970), porn actress (Gina Wild) and actress
 Karl-Heinz Smuda (born 1961), ghostwriter, editor and publisher in Berlin and Norfolk / Virginia (USA)
 Ralf Souquet (born 1968), poolbillard player
 Martin Stevens (born 1929), politician
 August Thyssen (1842–1926), founded the Thyssen-Foussol & Co. in Duisburg in 1867, and later on other steelworks. The company entered the ThyssenKrupp AG in 1997
 Joseph Thyssen (1844–1915), industrialist and the younger brother of August Thyssen

Notable people from Hehlrath
 Martin Schulz (born 1955), SPD - politician, Chairman of the Group of the Social Democratic Party of Europe in the European Parliament

Twin towns – sister cities

Eschweiler is twinned with:
 Reigate and Banstead, England, United Kingdom (1985)
 Sulzbach-Rosenberg, Germany (2019)
 Wattrelos, France (1975)

References

External links

Official site 

 
Aachen (district)
Castles in North Rhine-Westphalia